The Church of the Incarnation  is an American Roman Catholic parish church in the Roman Catholic Archdiocese of New York, located at 1290 St. Nicholas Avenue (Juan Pablo Duarte Boulevard) at the corner of 175th Street and St. Nicholas Avenue, Washington Heights, Manhattan, New York City, New York. The church is known as "the St. Patrick's Cathedral of Washington Heights".

History
The parish "was founded in 1908 by the Rev. P. J. Mahoney, D.D.", the parish's first pastor, formed in response to "…the rapid growth of the city along the Hudson River above 145th Street…".

Mass was said in a store until the erection in 1910 of a two-story building, which serves as a school and church. Ground for a church adjoins the school building on the corner of 175th and St. Nicholas Avenue".

In 1914, the Rev. Dr. Mahoney was still pastor and was assisted by the Rev. Francis A. Kiniry and Rev. Joseph V. Stanford, the three of whom occupied a recently completed "handsome three-story rectory".

The current pastor is Reverend Edward Russell.

Building

The present Gothic Revival stone buttressed-church with apse was built in 1928 to the designs of W. H. Jones with two small towers.

Internally, the contemporary-with-the-building baldacchino is of white marble and lit by rich stained-glass windows. "At the West End is a large and stunning rose window above the gallery. Twin organ facades with gold pipes face into the gallery from both sides, and additional organ facades are found in the North transept and in the apse".

Incarnation School
The Incarnation School is located at 570 West 175th Street. In 1914, the school which had been built with the church and completed in 1910 was in the charge of two Sisters of Charity of New York and two lay teachers, who oversaw 125 pupils. It was formerly staffed by the De La Salle Christian Brothers.

Incarnation School alumni
 Theodore McCarrick – Cardinal and laicized bishop of the Catholic Church

References 
Notes

External links

 , the church's official website

1928 establishments in New York City
20th-century Roman Catholic church buildings in the United States
Roman Catholic churches in Manhattan
Roman Catholic churches completed in 1928
Gothic Revival church buildings in New York City
Washington Heights, Manhattan